Synemon heliopis is a moth in the Castniidae family. It is found in Australia, including Western Australia.

The larvae probably feed on the roots of Ecdeiocolea monostachya and Spartochloa scirpoidea.

References

Moths described in 1891
Castniidae